Unfinished Affairs is a 2022 Spanish-Argentine neo-noir police thriller film directed by  which stars Fred Adenis and Natalia de Molina. It is an adaptation of the novel La maniobra de la tortuga by Benito Olmo.

Plot 
After police inspector Manuel Bianquetti is transferred from Madrid to Cádiz, he gets involved in the investigation of a criminal case around the corpse of a young woman.

Cast

Production 
An adaptation of the novel La maniobra de la tortuga by Benito Olmo, the screenplay was penned by Juan Miguel del Castillo alongside José Rodríguez. The film was produced by Áralan Films, A Contracorriente Films and La maniobra de la tortuga AIE alongside Aleph Media and it had the participation of RTVE, Canal Sur and Movistar+. Shooting began in May 2021 and wrapped in June 2021. Shooting locations included the province of Cádiz (Jerez de la Frontera, San Fernando, Cádiz) and Seville.

Release 
The film had its world premiere on 24 March 2022 at the 25th Málaga Film Festival, screened in the festival's main competition. Distributed by A Contracorriente Films, it was theatrically released in Spain on 13 May 2022. Latido Films swooped on international sales rights.

Reception 
Sergio F. Pinilla of Cinemanía rated the film 4½ out of 5 stars deeming the film to be the "best [Spanish] police thriller since Marshland (despite its ending)", also writing that "it is a fierce, intense thriller that also knows how to take advantage of the chromatic and scenic richness of the Tacita de Plata".

Beatriz Martínez of El Periódico de Catalunya scored 2 out of 5 stars, considering that the result of interweaving the codes of the investigative thriller with elements of social realism "is not always satisfactory", bringing in issues of lack of subtlety and certain clumsy storytelling.

Reviewing for El Cultural, Juan Sardá wrote that Juan Miguel del Castillo "without departing from the codes of the thriller, manages to extract moments of true humanity", likewise assessing that the "excellent direction manages to create a turbulent, unhealthy atmosphere", to which the great performances by Molina and Tatien add up.

Ekaitz Ortega of HobbyConsolas scored 64 out of 100 points ("acceptable"), highlighting the performances from the two leads and the use of the setting as an additional character among the best things about the film, while citing as a negative point that the two subplots fit together in a "somewhat forced way" and the social message, particularly the ending, is too unpolished.

Elsa Fernández Santos of El País considered Unfinished Affairs to be irregular (yet also timely), assessing that the film grows as it progresses, that could have blended both stories better and that Natalia de Molina "once again demonstrates her enormous acting talent".

Accolades 

|-
| rowspan = "12" align = "center" | 2023 || rowspan = "12" | 2nd Carmen Awards || colspan = "2" | Best Film ||  || rowspan = "12" | 
|-
| Best Director || Juan Miguel del Castillo || 
|-
| Best Actress || Natalia de Molina || 
|-
| Best Adapted Screenplay || Juan Miguel del Castillo, José Rodríguez || 
|-
| Best Supporting Actress || Mona Martínez || 
|-
| Best New Actor || Fran Caballero || 
|-
| Best Editing || Manuel Terceño || 
|-
| Best Art Direction || Vanesa de la Haza || 
|-
| Best Production Supervision || Sandra Rodríguez, Marta Velasco || 
|-
| Best Makeup and Hairstyles || Ana Beato, Rafael Mora || 
|-
| Best Sound || Dani de Zayas, Jorge Marín || 
|-
| Best Special Effects || Amparo Martínez || 
|}

See also 
 List of Spanish films of 2022

References

External links
 

Films shot in the province of Cádiz
Films shot in the province of Seville
Argentine thriller films
Films based on Spanish novels
Áralan Films films
Spanish crime thriller films
Films set in Andalusia
2020s Spanish-language films
2020s Spanish films
2020s Argentine films
Spanish neo-noir films